Podlachians, also known as Podlachian Masurians, are an ethnographic group of Polish people that inhabit an area of Podlachia in Poland, including Podlaskie and Lublin Voivodeships.

History 
They originated from Mazovia and in are descendants of Masovians who between 13th and 15th century had colonised area around the Bug river, mixing with the population of Ruthenians already present in the area.

Citations

Notes

References

Bibliography 
 Encyklopedia powszechna PWN, vol. 3, edition 3. Warsaw. PWN. 1985. ISBN 83-01-00003-1.

Ethnic groups in Poland
Slavic ethnic groups